Illigera is a genus of flowering plants in the family Hernandiaceae, found tropical regions of Africa and Asia.

Species
To date, 53 species have been named, but only the following are accepted:  
 Illigera appendiculata Blume (type species)
 Illigera aromatica S.Z. Huang & S.L. Mo
 Illigera brevistaminata Y.R. Li
 Illigera celebica Miq.
 Illigera cordata Dunn
 Illigera glabra Y.R. Li
 Illigera grandiflora W.W. Sm. & Jeffrey
 Illigera henryi W.W. Sm.
 Illigera khasiana C.B. Clarke
 Illigera luzonensis (C. Presl) Merr.
 Illigera nervosa Merr.
 Illigera orbiculata C.Y. Wu
 Illigera parviflora Dunn
 Illigera pentaphylla Welw.
 Illigera pseudoparviflora Y.R. Li
 Illigera rhodantha Hance (synonym I. petelotii)
 Illigera trifoliata (Griff.) Dunn
 Illigera vespertilio (Benth.) Baker f.

Other unresolved species include:
Illigera cardiophylla
Illigera coryzadenia
Illigera cucullata
Illigera dasyphylla
Illigera diptera
Illigera dubia
Illigera dunniana
Illigera elegans
Illigera elliptifolia
Illigera fordii
Illigera gammiei
Illigera glandulosa
Illigera kurzii
Illigera lucida
Illigera madagascariensis
Illigera megaptera
Illigera meyeniana
Illigera mollissima
Illigera novoguineensis
Illigera obtusa
Illigera ovatifolia
Illigera pierrei
Illigera platyandra
Illigera pubescens
Illigera pulchra
Illigera reticulata
Illigera rhodanthe
Illigera ternata
Illigera thorelii
Illigera villosa
Illigera yaoshanensis

References

External links

Hernandiaceae
Laurales genera